Newport County is a Welsh professional Association football club based in the city of Newport, Wales. The club was founded in 1912 as The Newport & Monmouth County Association Football Club, nicknamed The Ironsides after the Lysaght's Orb Works in the town. The club began in the Southern League but was reformed in 1919 and elected into the Football League in 1920. The first manager of Newport County was Davy McDougall, appointed in 1912. 

The club's current manager, its 52nd, is Graham Coughlan, appointed on 20 October 2022.

History 
Newport's first ever manager, the Scottish wing-half McDougall, played for the club as in its first year as a player-manager before moving to management. Billy Lucas is the club's longest serving manager having spent 17 years at Newport across three spells from 1953–1961, 1962–1967, and 1970–1974. Jimmy Hindmarsh is the club's longest continuously serving manager having spent 13 years at the club from 1922 until 1935. Newport's shortest reigning manager is Lee Harrison, who spent 5 days in charge as caretaker manager in 2011. The club's shortest reigning permanent manager is Eddie May who spent one month at the club during its tumultuous 1988 season.

Four managers have returned to the club for more than one spell in charge: Billy Lucas (1953–61, 1962–67, 1970–74), Colin Addison (1977–78, 1982–85), John Relish (1986, 1989–1993), and Tim Harris (1997–2002, 2011).

The club's most successful manager for honours is Len Ashurst who achieved promotion and a Cup win at the club. However Peter Beadle also achieved Cup wins and runner-up places, and Justin Edinburgh achieved a division play off victory and Cup runner-up place.

Only two County managers, John Relish and Justin Edinburgh, have been inducted into the club's Hall of Fame. Edinburgh was posthumously inducted in December 2019 before a fixture between Newport and Leyton Orient, who he was manager of at the time of his unexpected death in June 2019.

Achievements 

The first manager under whom Newport won a major trophy was Billy McCandless, who guided the club to the Third Division South championship in the 1938–39 season. Newport reached the fifth round of the 1948–49 FA Cup under manager Tom Bromilow, the furthest they have gone in the competition, later equalled in 2019. They only narrowly lost the game 3–2 to Portsmouth. Bobby Evans led the club to become runners-up in the 1963 Welsh Cup. Len Ashurst achieved a third place promotion in the 1979–80 Football League Fourth Division and the club became Welsh Cup champions in 1980 under Ashhurst. In 1987 under John Lewis the club were runners-up in the Welsh Cup, losing to Merthyr in the final. 

In 1989–90 John Relish secured the Hellenic League championship. Graham Rogers achieved the 1994–1995 Southern League Midland Division championship. Tim Harris again achieved the 2nd place promotion spot in the 1998–1999 Southern League Midland Division season. Peter Nicholas led the club to the runners-up spot in the 2003 FAW Premier Cup, which the club again achieved under Peter Beadle in 2007, and which was followed by Newport winning the competition the following year. Dean Holdsworth led the club to become Conference South champions in 2009–2010. The club were FA Trophy runners-up in 2012 under Justin Edinburgh. Edinburgh produced the club's most recent honours in 2013 when he went on to lead the club back into the Football League, winning the Conference National play-offs against fellow Welsh opponents Wrexham. 

Michael Flynn led the club to its joint best performance in the FA Cup, playing against Manchester City in the 2018–19 FA Cup 5th Round for only the second time since 1948–49. Flynn took the club to the 2019 EFL League Two play-off Finals where Newport were defeated by Tranmere Rovers and reached the semi-finals of the 2019–20 EFL Trophy where Newport lost to Salford City on penalties. Flynn again led Newport to the 2021 EFL League Two play-off Final, losing 1-0 to Morecambe.

List of managers

Managers with honours

Hall of Fame

Notes

References